Radzanów may refer to the following places:
Radzanów, Lublin Voivodeship (east Poland)
Radzanów, Białobrzegi County in Masovian Voivodeship (east-central Poland)
Radzanów, Świętokrzyskie Voivodeship (south-central Poland)
Radzanów, Mława County in Masovian Voivodeship (east-central Poland)